This is a list of English language words of Welsh language origin. As with the Goidelic languages, the Brythonic tongues are close enough for possible derivations from Cumbric, Cornish or Breton in some cases.

Beyond the acquisition of common nouns, there are numerous English toponyms, surnames, personal names or nicknames derived from Welsh (see Celtic toponymy, Celtic onomastics).

List

As main word choice for meaning

 bara brith  speckled bread. Traditional Welsh bread flavoured with tea, dried fruits and mixed spices.
 bard  from Old Celtic bardos, either through Welsh bardd (where the bard was highly respected) or Scottish bardis (where it was a term of contempt); Cornish bardh
 cawl  a traditional Welsh soup/stew; Cornish kowl
 coracle  from corwgl.  This Welsh term was derived from the Latin corium meaning "leather or hide", the material from which coracles are made.
 corgi  from cor, "dwarf" + gi (soft mutation of ci), "dog".
 cwm  (very specific geographic sense today) or coomb (dated). Cornish; komm; passed into Old English where sometimes written 'cumb'
 flannel  the Oxford English Dictionary says the etymology is "uncertain", but Welsh gwlanen  = "flannel wool" is likely.   An alternative source is Old French flaine, "blanket". The word has been adopted in most European languages. An earlier English form was flannen, which supports the Welsh etymology. Shakspeare's The Merry Wives of Windsor contains the term "the Welsh flannel".
 flummery  from llymru
 pikelet  a type of small, thick pancake. Derived from the Welsh bara pyglyd, meaning "pitchy [i.e. dark or sticky] bread", later shortened simply to pyglyd; The early 17th century lexicographer, Randle Cotgrave, spoke of "our Welsh barrapycleds". The word spread initially to the West Midlands of England, where it was anglicised to picklets and then to pikelets. The first recognisable crumpet-type recipe was for picklets, published in 1769 by Elizabeth Raffald in The Experienced English Housekeeper.
 wrasse  a kind of sea fish (derived via Cornish wrach, Welsh gwrach (meaning hag or witch)).

Esoteric or specialist
 cist  (archaeological) a stone-lined coffin
 cromlech  from crom llech literally "crooked flat stone"
 crwth  "a bowed lyre"
 kistvaen  from cist (chest) and maen (stone).
 lech /lɛk/  capstone of a cromlech, see above
 tref  meaning “hamlet, home, town.”; Cornish tre.

Words with indirect or possible links
Similar cognates across Goidelic (gaelic), Latin, Old French and the other Brittonic families makes isolating a precise origin hard. This applies to cross from Latin crux, Old Irish cros overtaking Old English rood ;  appearing in Welsh and Cornish as Croes, Krows. It complicates Old Welsh attributions for, in popular and technical topography, Tor (OW tŵr) and crag (Old Welsh carreg or craig) with competing Celtic derivations, direct and indirect, for the Old English antecedents.

 adder The Proto-Indo-European root netr- led to Latin natrix, Welsh neidr, Cornish nader, Breton naer, West Germanic nædro, Old Norse naðra, Middle Dutch nadre, any of which may have led to the English word.
 bow May be from Old English bugan "to bend, to bow down, to bend the body in condescension," also "to turn back", or more simply from the Welsh word bwa. A reason for the word Bow originating from Welsh, is due to Welsh Bowmen playing a major role in the Hundred Years War, such as the Battle of Crécy, Battle of Agincourt and the Battle of Patay, and the bows were often created in Wales.
 coombe meaning "valley", is usually linked with the Welsh cwm, also meaning "valley", Cornish and Breton komm.  However, the OED traces both words back to an earlier Celtic word, *.  It suggests a direct Old English derivation for "coombe".
(Coumba, or coumbo, is the common western-alpine vernacular word for "glen", and considered genuine gaulish (celtic-ligurian branch). Found in many toponyms of the western Alps like Coumboscuro (Grana valley), Bellecombe and Coumbafréide (Aoste), Combette (Suse), Coumbal dou Moulin (Valdensian valleys). Although seldom used, the word "combe" is included into major standard-french dictionaries. This could justify the celtic origin thesis).
 crockery
 It has been suggested that crockery might derive from the Welsh crochan, as well as the Manx crocan and Gaelic crogan, meaning "pot".  The OED states that this view is "undetermined".  It suggests that the word derives from Old English croc, via the Icelandic krukka, meaning "an earthenware pot or pitcher".
crumpet Welsh crempog, cramwyth, Cornish krampoeth or Breton Krampouezh; 'little hearth cakes'
 druid From the Old Celtic derwijes/derwos ("true knowledge" or literally "they who know the oak") from which the modern Welsh word derwydd evolved, but travelled to English through Latin (druidae) and French (druide)
gull from either Welsh or Cornish; Welsh gwylan, Cornish guilan, Breton goelann; all from O.Celt. *- "gull" (OE mæw)
iron or at least the modern form of the word "iron" (c/f Old English ísern, proto-Germanic *isarno, itself borrowed from proto-Celtic), appears to have been influenced by pre-existing Celtic forms in the British Isles: Old Welsh haearn, Cornish hoern, Breton houarn, Old Gaelic íarn (Irish , iarun, Scottish iarunn)
lawn from Welsh Llan  Cornish Lan (cf. Launceston, Breton Lann); Heath; enclosed area of land, grass about a Christian site of worship from Cornish Lan (e.g. Lanteglos, occasionally Laun as in Launceston) or Welsh Llan (e.g. Llandewi)
penguin possibly from pen gwyn, "white head". "The fact that the penguin has a black head is no serious objection." It may also be derived from the Breton language, or the Cornish Language, which are all closely related.  However, dictionaries suggest the derivation is from Welsh pen "head" and gwyn "white", including the Oxford English Dictionary, the American Heritage Dictionary, the Century Dictionary and Merriam-Webster, on the basis that the name was originally applied to the great auk, which had white spots in front of its eyes (although its head was black). Pen gwyn is identical in Cornish and in Breton. An alternative etymology links the word to Latin pinguis, which means "fat". In Dutch, the alternative word for penguin is "fat-goose" (vetgans see: Dutch wiki or dictionaries under Pinguïn), and would indicate this bird received its name from its appearance.
Mither
An English word possibly from the Welsh word "moedro" meaning to bother or pester someone. Possible links to the Yorkshire variant "moither"

In Welsh English

These are the words widely used by Welsh English speakers, with little or no Welsh, and are used with original spelling (largely used in Wales but less often by others when referring to Wales):
 afon  river
awdl  ode
bach  literally "small", a term of affection
cromlech  defined at esoteric/specialist terms section above
cwm  a valley
crwth  originally meaning "swelling" or "pregnant"
cwrw  Welsh ale or beer
cwtch  hug, cuddle, small cupboard, dog's kennel/bed
cynghanedd
 eisteddfod  broad cultural festival, "session/sitting" from eistedd "to sit" (from sedd "seat," cognate with L. sedere; see sedentary) + bod "to be" (cognate with O.E. beon; see be).
Urdd Eisteddfod (in Welsh "Eisteddfod Yr Urdd"), the youth Eisteddfod
englyn
gorsedd
 hiraeth  homesickness tinged with grief or sadness over the lost or departed. It is a mix of longing, yearning, nostalgia, wistfulness, or an earnest desire.
hwyl
iechyd da  cheers, or literally "good health"
mochyn  pig
nant  stream
  latter contrasts to Welsh plural which is sglodion.  Chips (England); fries (universally); french-fried potatoes such as from takeaways (used in Flintshire)
twp/dwp  idiotic, daft
ych â fi  an expression of disgust

See also

 Lists of English words of Celtic origin
 List of English words of Brittonic origin
 Brittonicisms in English

References

Sources
 Oxford English Dictionary

Welsh language
Welsh
Words
Welsh English